Cynthia Miscikowski (born 1948) is an American politician who represented the 11th District on the Los Angeles City Council for two full terms from 1997 through 2005. Previously, she was an aide to Councilman Marvin Braude and the Executive Director of the Skirball Cultural Center in its beginning stages. She served as the President of the Board of Harbor Commissioners under Mayor Antonio Villaraigosa, overseeing the Port of Los Angeles.

She joined forces with Muslim organizations to try to restrict the number of strip clubs and businesses with liquor licenses in her district, which contains the largest Muslim population of any City Council district in Los Angeles. Miscikowski is Vice Chairman of the LAPD Foundation and was awarded the 2008 Public Service Award by the UCLA Alumni Association.

References

Los Angeles City Council members
Living people
Women city councillors in California
Year of birth missing (living people)
21st-century American women